The Waywayseecappo First Nation is a First Nations band government whose reserve is located twenty miles (32 km) east of Russell, Manitoba, Canada. The First Nation's reserve is 10,059 hectare (24,856 acres) and is located near the southwestern corner of the Riding Mountain National Park. It is bordered by the Rural Municipality of Rossburn and the Rural Municipality of Silver Creek. The First Nation also hold interest together with 32 other First Nations on the 37.1 hectare (91.7 acre) Treaty Four Reserve Grounds (Indian Reserve No. 77), located adjacent to Fort Qu'Appelle. Its population was 1,219 in 2011. They are home of the MJHL team Waywayseecappo Wolverines. There are several businesses located in the Birdtail valley near PTH 45, such as a gas station, food mart, gaming centre, health centre, daycare, and community arena complex. As of April 1, 2014, the RMCP is no longer in the community, being replaced by the Manitoba First Nations Police Service.

Government 
Chief Murray Clearsky

Councillor Mel Wabash
Councillor Anthony Longclaws
Councillor Paul Mentuck
Councillor Tim Cloud
Councillor Joe Gambler 
Councillor Laura Brandon

See also
 Aboriginal peoples in Manitoba

References

External links
AANDC profile
Aboriginal Canada Portal profile of the First Nation

Map of Waywayseecappo First Nation at Statcan

First Nations governments in Manitoba
Ojibwe governments